Angel Island is a populated island in East Aitape Rural LLG, Sandaun Province, Papua New Guinea.

The Yakamul language is spoken on the island.

References

Islands of Sandaun Province